Emery is a populated place in Montgomery County, North Carolina, United States.  It is located along the co-designated Interstate 73 - Interstate 74, approximately 50 miles south of Greensboro where the interstates intersect U.S. Route 220.  It is roughly equidistant between Raleigh to the east and Charlotte to the west.

References

Villages in North Carolina
Villages in Montgomery County, North Carolina